Maidza is a surname. Notable people with the surname include:

David Maidza (born 1971), Zimbabwean rugby union player and coach
Tkay Maidza (born 1995), Zimbabwean-born Australian singer-songwriter and rapper

Bantu-language surnames